Patrick Murphy (1834–1862) was an Irish giant, born in County Down of parents James Murphy and mother Peggy (née Cunningham), who exhibited himself as a means of income. He originally worked on the docks in Liverpool, England and later became a waiter at a hotel. Because he was a man of extraordinary height, Murphy attracted crowds everywhere he went. He eventually decided that he could make an honest living being tall. He had always billed himself as being  and in some circles as much as 9'3".

In May 1857 the Emperor and Empress of Austria invited the towering native of Ireland to visit their kingdom. On April 18th, 1862, while he was on tour throughout Europe, he died of smallpox in Marseilles at the age of twenty-eight.

References

1834 births
1862 deaths
People with gigantism
People from County Down
Deaths from smallpox
Infectious disease deaths in France